The World Football Phone-in is a British weekly radio phone-in show about association football around the world. Hosted by Dotun Adebayo, it is part of the nightly Up All Night programming on BBC Radio 5 Live which he presents. The football show is broadcast in the 2am to 4am slot now on Tuesday mornings, and is also released as a podcast. Regular contributors are awarded a 'Brazilian shirt name' as a nickname.

Occasionally the entire programme (15am) is dedicated to the phone-in.

Pundits

Knowledge about players and clubs from different parts of the world, and, in Adebayo's words, 'players from over there playing in our leagues', is provided by using selected experts each week who have knowledge about a specific confederation, currently drawn from:

Tim "Legendinho" Vickery (South America)
Mark "Springboca Junior" Gleeson (Africa)
Mina "The Colonel" Rzouki (Europe)
Paul "Galatasarahs" Sarahs (Europe/World)
John "Northern Seoul" Duerden (Asia)
Jon "Neigh-mar" Arnold (CONCACAF)
Mark "Viva Mark Vegas" Meadows (Europe)
Maher "Chicken Tikka Mo Salah" Mezahi (North Africa)

Former pundits include Sean "The Big Wheel" Wheelock, Lester Smith (both CONCACAF), Mani Djazmi (Asia), Andy"Top Brass" Brassell (Europe), Durosimi "Leone Ranger" Thomas (Africa), and Hiral "The Uxbridge Massive" Bhatt (Africa).

Brazilian Shirt Name Holders

 Andrew "The Gent" Kurowski (Blackheath)
 Cleo "The Book" Sharp (Aldershot)
Patrick "This Charming Van" (Manchester, Amsterdam)
 Drew "Ballack Obama" Trammell (Chicago)
Michael "Magpie and Mash" Roberts
Matthew "Goooooliath" Semisch (North Dakota)
Kevin "Lisbonny Lad" Romao
Daniel "Deli Ali" Karell (Daniel in Louisville)
 Jonathan “Saskatchewan-Bissaka” (Montreal, Canada)
Tsering "Bhöjhattino" Norbu (Oakland, CA)
 Dustin "Elk Classico" Kreps (Thunder Bay, ON)

References

External links
 Radio 5 Live Up All Night
 World Football Phone-in Facebook site
 World Football Phone-in podcast
 Kalou's World Football Phone-in tribute song

BBC Radio 5 Live programmes
Football mass media in the United Kingdom